John Vargas is an American actor best known for his role in the films Primary Colors and Star Trek II: The Wrath of Khan. "Seduced By Evil" 1994.

Early life
John Vargas was born in the Bronx and moved to Puerto Rico when his father Juan A. Maldonado was killed in Laos during the Vietnam war Upon finishing high school he was accepted to the Drama Department at Carnegie Mellon University, becoming the first Puerto Rican to graduate from its drama dept. Upon graduating, Vargas moved to Los Angeles.

Career
John Vargas was cast in Neil Simon's film Only When I Laugh, with Marsha Mason and James Coco. The following year, he featured in the film Star Trek II: The Wrath of Khan in the role of Jedda, and then joined the cast of ABC's At Ease, becoming one of the first Latino actors to star in an American television sitcom.

Vargas also appeared as Oliviera in The Hanoi Hilton.

Vargas joined the ensemble cast of the film Primary Colors, directed by Academy Award-winning director Mike Nichols, and starring John Travolta, Emma Thompson and Kathy Bates.

The following year, Vargas was cast in the role of Asher, the eurotrash maitre d' in the Fox comedy series Action, starring Jay Mohr and Illeana Douglas.

John Vargas has worked on several soap operas. He joined the cast of General Hospital in the role of Rico Chacone, and Santa Barbara as Marcos Llamera. In 2004, John was cast as Dr. Rojas in the soap opera Days of Our Lives. He also appeared in season 4, episode 11 of Star Trek: Voyager. He played Pierson in the Sliders episode (5/8) A Current Affair (1999).

Filmography 
Only When I Laugh (1981) - Manuel
Star Trek II: The Wrath of Khan (1982) - Jedda
My Tutor (1983) - Manuel
Mass Appeal (1984) - Scott Alvarez
Wildcats (1986) - Poolhall Man #3
The Hanoi Hilton (1987) - Oliviera
Last Stand at Lang Mei (1989) - Pvt. Wolfdreamer
Sunset Park (1996) - Mr. Santiago
In Dark Places (1997) - Karl
Primary Colors (1998) - Lorenzo Delgado
The Minus Man (1999) - Priest
Largo (2000) - Lucky Moreno
Across the Line (2000) - Alvarez
Zoolander (2001) - Italian Designer
The Commission (2003) - Loran Hall
Charlotta-TS (2010) - Father Juan
The Lost One (2015) - Gypsy

References

External links

Living people
Male actors from New York City
People from the Bronx
Carnegie Mellon University College of Fine Arts alumni
20th-century American male actors
Year of birth missing (living people)